Ricki Osterthun (born 2 May 1964) is a former tennis player from West Germany, who won one single title (1985, Hilversum) during his professional career.

The right-hander reached his highest singles ATP-ranking on 19 October 1987, when Osterhun became the number 58 of the world.

Career finals

Singles (1 win, 2 losses)

Doubles (3 wins)

External links
 
 
 

1964 births
Living people
Tennis players from Hamburg
West German male tennis players